Loo, or Shụŋọ, is an Adamawa language of Nigeria.  It is one of the more than 500 native languages spoken in that country.  As of 1992, the approximate number of Loo speakers was 8,000.  Those speakers reside in parts of Gombe State and also the adjacent state to the south: Taraba State.

References

Languages of Nigeria
Bambukic languages